The Barka River (nahr Baraka) is a tributary river that flows from the Eritrean Highlands to the plains of Sudan. With a length of over 640 km, it rises just outside Asmara and flows in a northwestern direction through Agordat. The river merges with the Anseba River near the border with Sudan.

In Sudan, the Barka flows seasonally to a delta on the Red Sea, near the town of Tokar.

See also
 List of rivers of Eritrea
 List of rivers of Sudan

References

Barka River
Rivers of Sudan